is a railway station on the Ōu Main Line in the city of Yuzawa, Akita Prefecture,  Japan, operated by JR East.

Lines
Yokobori Station is served by the Ōu Main Line, and is located 198.4 km from the terminus of the line at Fukushima Station.

Station layout
The station consists of one side platform and one island platform connected to the station building by a footbridge. The station is staffed.

Platforms

History
Yokobori Station opened on July 5, 1905 as a station on the Japanese Government Railways (JGR). The JGR became the Japan National Railways (JNR) after World War II. The station was absorbed into the JR East network upon the privatization of the JNR on April 1, 1987.

Passenger statistics
In fiscal 2018, the station was used by an average of 120 passengers daily (boarding passengers only).

Surrounding area
Yokobori is home to the Komachi-do temple celebrating the Heian Period poet Ono no Komachi, who died here. Every year when peonies are in full bloom lading the air with scent, normally the second Sunday of June, local people host the Komachi Matsuri. During the festival, seven "komachi musume" are reading out the waka poems, and small children parade through the area as well as a performance of Komachi taiko drums. About 30 minutes by car southeast from Yokobori along Japan National Route 108 is the Akinomiya Hot Spring Resort area.

Gallery

See also
List of railway stations in Japan

References

External links

 JR East Station information 

Railway stations in Japan opened in 1904
Railway stations in Akita Prefecture
Ōu Main Line
Yuzawa, Akita